Kildonan Park is a park in the West Kildonan area of northern Winnipeg, Manitoba, Canada.

Established in 1909 as a  park, it features the Peguis Pavilion, Rainbow Stage, the Witch's Hut, an Olympic-sized outdoor swimming pool, duck pond, and soccer field as well as picnic tables and barbecue pits. The Park was originally designed by George Champion who was the park's Superintendent. There are picnic sites and shelters available for rent.
In winter the park features a skating pond and two tobogganing slides.

History 
Kildonan Park was established in 1909.

In 2013–14 landscape architectural firm Scatliff + Miller + Murray were commissioned to come up with a new vision for Kildonan Park. SMM's report, the Kildonan Park Master Plan, was published in January 2015. The report identified several issues, that, when implemented would improve the functioning and enjoyment of the park. Originally design plans from the park's inception in 1909 called for a boat launch area/marina. However this has never been implemented as further study regarding riverbank erosion must take place first. The report recommends that Lord Selkirk Creek be restored to its pre-dammed state as much as is possible. Input during the public feedback stage for the Master Plan indicated a poor wayfinding system, especially for pedestrians. Rainbow Stage has an opportunity to have extended use beyond the seven weeks where live performance theatre events take place. It was suggested in the report that a farmer's market, car show, extending the operating weeks of Rainbow Stage with additional live theatre events, as well as displays of "seasonal art".

Features

Rainbow Stage

Rainbow Stage is Canada's longest-surviving outdoor theatre. The covered, open-air theatre seats 2,600 people.

Outdoor pool and splash pad 
Kildonan Pool is a  outdoor Olympic-size pool, completed in May 1966, opened on July 20, 1966. After a C$3 million upgrade, a splash pad, water slide, and a beach-style shallow end were added in August 2010.

During the preparation for the 1967 Pan Am Games, one of scenarios for a facility for the swimming and diving events was to build two outdoor pools — one within Assiniboine Park, the other at Kildonan Park. Instead, at the urging of Metro Coun. Jack Willis, an indoor pool, Pan Am, was built instead.

Peguis Pavilion
A few years after Kildonan Park opened, the first pavilion was opened in 1915 and cost C$13,000 to construct. It was demolished in 1964 to make way for the second pavilion.

Designed by architectural firm Blankstein Coop Gillmor and Hanna (now Number Ten), the Peguis Pavilion (originally called the Kildonan Park Pavilion) building was built in the 1960s and officially opened in 1966 with a budget of $125,000. It is near Lord Selkirk Creek, which was dammed. The architectural firm chosen for the Pavilion project was Blankstein Coop Gilmor Hanna.

In 2012, the pavilion underwent $2 million in renovations, including new heating and air conditioning, public washrooms on the main floor and basement, a new family washroom, a new elevator, refurbished kitchen and restaurant — Prairie's Edge Restaurant, and a new roof. In spring 2013, landscaping around the pavilion was completed, including pond renovations.

Witch's Hut

The Witch's Hut is a small building designed to illustrate the Brothers Grimm fairy tale Hansel and Gretel.

Dedicated and opened in October 1970, the Witch's Hut was a Centennial Project of the German Community of Manitoba and a gift to the children of the Province. Also known as das Hexenhaus, the hut was designed by Manitoba architect Hans Peter Langes. The hut contains relief terracotta panels depicting the fairy tale in sequential scenes, along with full scale images of Hansel, Gretel and the witch.

Public Art
Bokeh, an artwork created by Takashi Iwasaki and Nadi Design was installed around the duck pond in 2018.  Bokeh lights the skating area in the dark of winter.. Bokeh is a Japanese word for blurriness.

References

External links
Kildonan Park (official page)
Friends of Kildonan Park
 Kildonan Park Master Plan (2015)

Parks in Winnipeg
Kildonan, Winnipeg
Seven Oaks, Winnipeg
1909 establishments in Manitoba
1966 establishments in Manitoba